HP BASIC may refer to any of several different BASIC dialects, of distinct lineages, created at either Hewlett-Packard (HP) or Digital Equipment Corporation (DEC).

 HP Time-Shared BASIC, created at HP in the 1960s; for HP 2100 series minicomputers
 Rocky Mountain BASIC, created at HP, now transferred to Keysight; for HP 9000 and other platforms; often used with HP-IB instruments
 VSI BASIC for OpenVMS, created at DEC, and previously known as HP BASIC for OpenVMS prior to the transfer to VSI; for the RSTS, VMS, PDP, VAX, Alpha, and Integrity platforms
 BASIC (HP series 80), created at HP in the 1980s; for the HP series 80 desktop computers
 BASIC (HP calculators), created at HP in the 1980s; for HP calculators
 Prime Programming Language (PPL), created at HP in the 1990s; for the HP 38, 39, 40, and Prime algebraic/graphing calculators; once called "HP Basic"

See also
 BASIC - BASIC language and dialects in general
 HP HPL - High Performance Language for the HP 9800 series